Mimosciadella is a genus of longhorn beetles of the subfamily Lamiinae, containing the following species:

 Mimosciadella fuscosignata Breuning, 1958
 Mimosciadella subinermicollis Breuning, 1958

References

Desmiphorini